Bimanbandar Thana is a thana of Sylhet City.

History
Bimanbandar Thana was created on 11 August 2011. It is composed of Ward-6, Ward-7, Khadimnagar Union, and Tuker Bazar Union.

References

Thanas of Sylhet